Yang Yong-eun (born 15 January 1972), also called Y. E. Yang, is a South Korean professional golfer who currently plays on the PGA Tour Champions. He was previously a member of the PGA Tour, where he won twice, including most notably the 2009 PGA Championship when he came from behind to defeat Tiger Woods, thus winning the first major championship by a male player born in Asia.

Professional career

In 2006 he won the Korea Open, an Asian Tour event, gaining him entry into the HSBC Champions Tournament in November 2006. He won the tournament, beating a strong field including runner-up Tiger Woods. The victory earned him membership of the European Tour and moved him into the top 40 of the Official World Golf Ranking. In 2008 he played on the PGA Tour after earning his membership through qualifying school; he had to regain his tour card in 2009 after placing 157th on the money list in 2008. Yang won his first title on the PGA Tour at the 2009 Honda Classic in his 46th career start in the United States. With this win, he became only the second Korean after K. J. Choi to win on the PGA Tour.

On 16 August 2009, Yang won the 91st PGA Championship, his first major championship, overcoming a two-shot deficit going into the final round to finish three strokes ahead of Woods, his playing partner. The victory was the first major championship for a male player born in Asia, surpassing the runners-up finishes achieved by Lu Liang-Huan in the 1971 Open Championship, Isao Aoki in the 1980 U.S. Open and Chen Tze-chung in the 1985 U.S. Open. The previous best finish by a Korean was Choi's 3rd place in the 2004 Masters Tournament. It was also the first time that Woods had failed to win a major after holding at least a share of the lead at the end of 54 holes. Yang was ranked 110th worldwide prior to the tournament, but moved up to 34th after the victory. The win earned Yang a five-year PGA Tour exemption and helped him to a top ten finish overall on the PGA Tour.

In April 2010, Yang won the Volvo China Open with a one-under-par 71 final round.

In February 2011, Yang had his best run at the WGC-Accenture Match Play Championship reaching the quarter-finals before eventually succumbing to American Matt Kuchar, 2 & 1. Previously Yang had defeated Álvaro Quirós on the 20th hole in round one, Stewart Cink, 4 & 3, in round two and the 2010 U.S. Open champion Graeme McDowell in round three, 3 & 2.

The following week Yang was in contention for his 3rd PGA Tour title at The Honda Classic, an event where he had earned his inaugural PGA Tour win in 2009. Despite entering the final round five strokes behind the eventual winner Rory Sabbatini, he was able to close the gap to just one stroke by birdieing the par-three 15th, where he was 18 inches away from a hole in one. However, needing an eagle on the par-five 18th after Sabbatini had stretched his lead to two with a birdie on the par-four 16th, he was unable to hole his bunker shot and a birdie earned him a runner-up finish one stroke behind the winner.

Yang reached a career high OWGR ranking of 19th in 2010, but a string of bad finishes and missed cuts in 2013 and 2014 plummeted the former major winner to 638th at the end of 2014, the final year of his PGA Tour exemption after winning the 2009 PGA Championship. A poor 2014 saw Yang finish well outside the top 150 in the FedEx Cup, which limited him to the Past Champions category for 2015. Yang spent much of 2015 playing on the European Tour and Asian Tour. 2015 saw a resurgence for Yang, making the cut at the PGA Championship for the first time in multiple years. Yang moved up to 262nd in the world by November 2015.

After a poor 2016 European Tour season where he finished outside 110th, Yang regained his Tour card through Q School.

In 2021, Yang got disqualified from 103rd PGA Championship at The Ocean Course, Kiawah Island Resort, in South Carolina for signing an incorrect scorecard following the second round.

In February 2022, after turning 50, Yang joined the PGA Tour Champions.

Personal life
Yang was born in the island province of Jeju-do. He is the fourth of eight children. He started to play golf at the age of 19 while picking golf balls part-time and, later, working as a golf instructor at Jeju's Ora Country Club. Yang learned by watching the movements of players who visited his golf club. Although he now has coaches, Yang is a self-taught golfer. His brother recommended he try hitting balls at a local driving range. Trying to get a 'proper job', Yang fell down a flight of stairs and tore his ACL while he was learning to use an excavator for a construction company. After recovering from his knee injury, he began mandatory service in the South Korean military at the age of 21.

On conclusion of his service, he moved to New Zealand, where he pursued a professional career in golf. He turned semi-pro on 21 July 1995 and pro on 22 August 1996. Yang is married to Young-Joo Park and has three sons. He is an active owner of an indoor golf range in the Koreatown section of Dallas. He currently resides in Southlake, Texas, near fellow South Korean PGA player K. J. Choi.

Professional wins (12)

PGA Tour wins (2)

European Tour wins (3)

1Co-sanctioned by the Asian Tour, Sunshine Tour and PGA Tour of Australasia
2Co-sanctioned by the OneAsia Tour

Japan Golf Tour wins (5)

Japan Golf Tour playoff record (0–1)

Asian Tour wins (2)

1Co-sanctioned by the Korean Tour
2Co-sanctioned by the European Tour, Sunshine Tour and PGA Tour of Australasia

OneAsia Tour wins (2)

1Co-sanctioned by the European Tour
2Co-sanctioned by the Korean Tour

OneAsia Tour playoff record (0–1)

Korean Tour wins (3)

1Co-sanctioned by the Asian Tour
2Co-sanctioned by the OneAsia Tour

Major championships

Wins (1)

Results timeline
Results not in chronological order in 2020.

CUT = missed the half-way cut
"T" = tied
DQ = disqualified
NT = No tournament due to COVID-19 pandemic

Summary

Most consecutive cuts made – 5 (2011 Masters – 2012 Masters)
Longest streak of top-10s – 2 (2009 PGA – 2010 Masters)

Results in The Players Championship

CUT = missed the halfway cut
"T" indicates a tie for a place

Results in World Golf Championships

QF, R16, R32, R64 = Round in which player lost in match play
"T" = tied
Note that the HSBC Champions did not become a WGC event until 2009.

Team appearances
Professional
Royal Trophy (representing Asia): 2007, 2012 (winners)
Presidents Cup (International team): 2009, 2011
World Cup (representing South Korea): 2009

See also
2007 PGA Tour Qualifying School graduates
2008 PGA Tour Qualifying School graduates
2016 European Tour Qualifying School graduates
List of men's major championships winning golfers

References

External links

 
South Korean male golfers
Japan Golf Tour golfers
European Tour golfers
PGA Tour golfers
PGA Tour Champions golfers
Winners of men's major golf championships
South Korean expatriates in New Zealand
South Korean expatriates in the United States
Sportspeople from Jeju Province
Golfers from Dallas
South Korean Buddhists
1972 births
Living people